So You Wanna Be a Popstar? is a New Zealand celebrity karaoke reality series that pits celebrities against each other in front of a judging panel.

The singers
John "Cocksy" Cocks
Jessie Gurunathan
Mikey Havoc
David Wikaira-Paul
Katrina Hobbs
Blair Strang
Louise Wallace

Christmas Special
On Christmas Day 2005, the cast of So You Wanna Be a Popstar? got together to sing Christmas carols. Guests included New Zealand Idol season 2 winner Rosita Vai and runner-up Nik Carlson with Teresa Bergman and Graham Brazier.

Dutch version
A Dutch version of So You Wanna Be a Popstar was broadcast on SBS6 in 2007.

References

New Zealand reality television series
New Zealand music television series
Popstars
TVNZ original programming